Sacred water may refer to:

 Holy water, ritually sanctified water
 Sacred waters, water from a sacred source
 Sacred Water, a 1993 book by Leslie Marmon Silko
 Sacred Water, a 2016 Rwandan film

See also 
 Holy water (disambiguation)